CoDominium is a series of future history novels written by American writer Jerry Pournelle, along with several co-authors, primarily Larry Niven.

Series

Setting

Formation of the CoDominium
The point of departure of Pournelle's history is the establishment of the CoDominium (CD), a political alliance and later union between the United States of America and a revitalized Soviet Union. This union, achieved in the name of planetary stability, reigns over the Earth for over a hundred years. In that time, it achieves peace of a sort, as well as interstellar colonization, but at the price of a complete halt in both scientific and political evolution.

The CoDominium (CD) is a supranational alliance of the United States of America and the Union of Soviet Socialist Republics. This alliance eventually becomes a de facto planetary government, and later, an interstellar empire. Despite this, no other nations on Earth are given representation or membership. Other major powers become mere client states. It is governed by a "Grand Senate", which is composed of Senators chosen from the two superpowers. A CoDominium Council exists and appears to function as a judicial branch. The CD did not unify the United States and the USSR, who appear to retain their separate identities and mutual distrust. The CD was only created for the shared benefit of the two member states. It does not govern either nation, and each state has been allowed to retain their government structures, nationalities, military forces, and to run their own internal affairs.

The United States of the CoDominium Era is a welfare state divided into two social classes: Citizens and Taxpayers. "Citizens" are welfare dependents who are required to live in walled sections of cities called "Welfare Islands." People are given whatever they need, including the drugs like Borloi to keep them pacified. There are no limits to welfare if they want it, except that they must live on a Welfare Island. Although people are free to gain an education and work or become a colonist, many citizens did not, preferring to live their whole lives supported by the government. Generally, citizens are uneducated and illiterate. Some BuReLoc involuntary colonists are Citizens. By the late CD era, the Welfare Islands were three generations old. "Taxpayers" are the working, educated, and privileged middle to the upper class. They carry identification cards to separate them from Citizens.

The Empire is organized by sectors, ruled by a Viceroy who serves as a representative of the Crown. Each sector has its own Council, headed by a Lord President, and its own Parliament. The Imperial government is divided into several ministries, including External Affairs, War, and Science. Some planets are governed by an aristocracy, although at least one member world is a republic.

For the most part, the stars with inhabitable planets in the CoDominium are obscure and unnamed on current star charts. For instance, the world of New Washington and its sister planet Franklin orbit a red dwarf at some distance from the Solar System. Such stars are very common in the galaxy but even the closest ones are too dim to observe without equipment, Proxima Centauri being the obvious example. Other habitable systems in the CoDominium have stars in the stellar classes F, G and K, which are common but dim compared to the named stars in the night sky. One of the few stars explicitly named in the CoDominium stories is 82 Eridani, containing the Meiji colony. Viewed from Earth, 82 Eridani is a star of the fourth magnitude at 20 light-years distance. Beyond 50 light-years such stars are below sixth magnitude and therefore invisible to the naked eye, so they are unnamed and largely unrecorded, except in astronomical sky surveys. These are the stars likely to host colonies of the CoDominium. There is no mention in the canon of closer candidate systems such as Tau Ceti and Epsilon Indi.

During the CoDominium era, instantaneous interstellar travel as a result of the Alderson Drive easily gave humanity the ability to explore, colonize, and exploit various star systems. As a result, many of the space settlements are on planets that are similar to Earth. At the very least, a colony world was barely inhabitable for human life without technological support. Many colonies were founded by ethnic minorities, religious groups, or political groups. Some are started by businesses, for commercial reasons. Most lack an industrial base and have little advanced technology as a result. The elite, more technologically advanced colonies are ones settled and supported by the Earth countries. These elite worlds have their own fleets and enjoy some independence from the CD.

These are apparently systems that retained enough technology after the Secession Wars to present a threat to the Second Empire, by resisting takeover and mounting raids against Empire systems. The presence or threat of Outies is mentioned in all the Second Empire stories as a reason for the Imperial Navy having to deal with events in the most expeditious way possible, rather than allowing time to achieve ideal solutions.

Pournelle's daughter, Jennifer R. Pournelle, has drawn on these themes, writing Outies, an authorized sequel to King David's Spaceship, The Mote in God's Eye, and The Gripping Hand, that attempts to marry hard science fiction with social science fiction as it explores what it means to be an "alien" in this Empire, and to what degree biology is destiny. Outies was first published as an e-book in 2010, and was then released in trade paperback in Q1, 2011.

References

External links
Jerry Pournelle's Future History

Book series introduced in 1973
 
Fictional governments
Future history
Military science fiction novels
Science fiction book series
Alternate history book series